Muqātil ibn Sulaymān (d. 767 C.E.) was an 8th-century story teller of the Quran. He wrote one of the earliest, if not first, commentaries (tafsir) of the Qur'an still available today.

Biography 
Born in Balkh in Khorasan, there are no works that date his birth, but some have estimated his birth year to be around 80 H. He spent his early life in both Balkh and Marw. In Balkh, he was impacted by the religious diversity it had in the pre-islamic era. He later migrated to Marw in order to get married. During the caliphate of Marwan II, Muqatil was involved in the civil war between the Abbasids and Umayyads. With the end of Umayyad rule he migrated to Iraq, settling in Basra and then moving to Baghdad. Due to possible Zaydi influence, he preferred the Abbasids to the previous Umayyad government, and some sources indicate that he would frequent the Abbasid court. Once, when visiting the Caliph al-Mansur, a fly sat on his face. Muqatil remarked that God had created the fly to humble the tyrants.

He later returned to Basra where he died in 150 H (767 CE).

Theology 

Muqatil's views stood in complete opposite to the views of the contemporary Mu'tazila, as his ideas related to physical aspects and likening God to human image and activity. His views on divine anthropomorphism were notorious to later generations, but in spite of his “extreme” corporealism, he employed ta'wil in his tafsir even on verses on the attributes of Allah believed by many to show the contradiction in his thought.

Muqatil Ibn Sulayman also strongly associated "commanding right" with furthering the monotheism that he taught, but also with a pacifist approach.

Views on Divine Attributes 
He interpreted the divine attributes in a literal, sometimes anthropomorphic sense, affirming Wajh Allah (the divine countenance), as a literal face, Ayn Allah (the divine eye) as a literal eye, Yad Allah (the divine hand) as a literal hand. He stated that God sat on the throne - describing Istiwa as Istaqarra (settlement), although he states that he did this before creating the creation. Closer inspection of his Tafsir yields that he inclined towards anthropomorphist interpretation of the Kursi (throne) and the right side of God (as well as the seeing of God which is seen as anthropomorphic by the Mu'tazila who thought God can only be seen if he is a Jism (body)).

Other views reported from Muqatil is that he said that God spoke through his mouth to Moses and he reportedly narrated the following Hadith:

More extreme views were allegedly held by him, including that God possessed bodily parts such as flesh, blood, hair, bones etc. Muslim scholars were so convinced of Muqatil's extreme anthropomorphism that they even came up with the term "Muqatiliyyah" to designate a sect which allegedly followed Muqatil in such views.

Al-Ash'ari reports that Muqatil and Dawud al-Jawabiri, said that God is a body and possesses an image like a human being with flesh, blood, hair, bones and limbs such as hand, leg, head, and eyes, though he states that they said that with all of these he is completely unlike the creation, and that the creation does not resemble him.

Clash with Jahm bin Safwan 
There was an intense theological and political debate that took place in the mosque of Marw between Muqatil and Jahm bin Safwan (d. 128 H/ 746 CE), regarding the divine attributes and a dispute between two political figures that Muqatil and Jahm were affiliated with. Each of them ended up writing a book refuting the other, and Muqatil used his political links to get Jahm expelled from Balkh, having him sent to Termez. In 128 H, in a subsequent battle with Muqatil's sponsor, Jahm was killed.

The accusations of anthropomorphism against Muqatil were seen as the logical opposite to those who held the negationist views of Jahm, to whom the term "Jahmiyyah" was used (as the opposite of "Muqatiliyyah"). The Sunni Muslims thus positioned themselves in the middle, between the two extremes, neither negating God's attributes nor likening them to the creation.

Works 
Muqatil is the author of a tafsir (commentary) on the Quran that John Wansbrough considers the oldest surviving complete tafsir and discusses in some detail. This work was still in manuscript when Wansbrough wrote but has since been published.

Reception 
Scholars contemporary to him were the first to criticise him, and did so in three areas. Abu Hanifa (d. 150 H/ 767 CE) criticised his theology, Abdullah Ibn Mubarak (d. 181 H/ 797 CE) criticised his methodology (particularly that he did not quote Hadith with chains of transmission), and the accusation of being a liar is attributed to Wakee ibn al-Jarrah (d. 197/ 812 CE).

Abu Hanifa in particular warned Abu Yusuf (d. 182/798) of two groups from Khorasan, the Jahmiyyah and the Muqatiliyyah. Ibn Hajar in particular quotes the following from him: "Two disgusting opinions came to us from the east: Jahm the negator [of God’s attributes] and Muqatil the anthropomorphist." Ibn Rajab al-Hanbali stated that the early scholars (as-salaf) rejected Muqatil's views after they became known after his debate with Jahm. Some early traditionalists are said to have gone too far, with Makki ibn Ibrahim (d. 215 H), the teacher of al-Bukhari, permitting the killing of Muqatil. Some, such as Kharijah ibn Mus'ab (d. 168 H/ 785 CE), were so outraged that they said they would do the deed themselves if they could.

Hadith 
On the field of Hadith tradition, Muqatil was also rejected in Hadith, being accused of reporting hadith from those he never met, and in one instance, reportedly asking a local ruler if he wanted him to forge a Hadith.

Medieval hadith scholars such as Ahmad ibn Hanbal and Ibn Abi Hatim has said that Hadith found in the works Muqatil are fabricated, while the chains, according to Ahmad, are nonexistent at all.

Al-Bukhari (d. 256 H) rejected him saying he was nothing at all, and many other scholars of Hadith also criticised him, such as Yahya ibn Ma'in (d. 233 H), an-Nasa'i (d. 303 H) and ad-Daraqutni (d. 385) H), both of whom accused him of lying. The traditionist and historian Ibn Sa'd (d. 230) in his complete biography of Muqatil says that Muqatil was "The one who had a tafsir, He related from al-Dahhak ibn Muzahim and Ata ibn Abi Rabah, students of Ibn Abbas. Some of the people of hadith were wary of his hadith and objected to them,"  Ibn Sa'd describes him as one of the Fuqaha' and Hadith scholars in Khurasan and does not give him a date of death. There is however unanimous consensus that Muqatil was not a scholar of Hadith. He did not use the isnaads (chains of narration) properly. Amidst the scholars of Islam, Muqatil's reputation is that of a storyteller.

The Muhaddith Ibn Hibban (d. 354 H), author of the Sahih, summarised the opinions of the early generations on Muqatil thus, "He relied on Jewish and Christian sources in his interpretation of the Qurʾān; he was also an anthropomorphist assimilating God to His creatures; and in addition he used to forge ḥadīths"

Al-Khatib al-Baghdadi (d. 463 H) was the first to accuse him of being a story teller, and the historian Ibn Asakir (d. 571 H) was the first to be explicit about this.

Tafsir 
Aside from theology and Hadith, Muslim scholars however were at times positive about his contributions to Tafsir (exegesis of the Qur'an). Ibn Hajar (d. 852 H) for instance, who repudiates him as a liar and anthropomorphist, nevertheless brings positive comments on his Tafsir and other scholars were known to do this. Early exegete Al-Tabari (d. 310 H) even quoted his view on the mysterious letters in the Qur'an as numerical counts, but was reluctant to name Muqatil as his source, stating he was among those whose views were not to be trusted. This could suggest that Muqatil's reputation had become so tainted, that few were willing to be associated with him by al-Tabari's time.

Ibn Taymiyyah (d. 728 H) however rejects the theological criticisms of Muqatil, arguing that those who criticised him, took their material from his enemies, specifically Al-Ash'ari was to blame for taking Maqalat from the works of the Mutazila. He also rejected the accusation of anthropomorphism for Muqatil, saying he could not find any traces of anything he would consider anthropomorphic in Muqatil's works, and therefore he could not be an anthropomorphist. He quotes al-Shafi'i saying, "Whoever desires tafsir, he is dependent on Muqatil, Whosoever wants fiqh he is dependent on Abu Hanifa". 
Dr. Abdulkader al-Housien a Syrian tafsir scholar said that his teacher Dr. Nureddin 'Itr the famous Hadith scholar said it’s falsely attributed to imam Shafii. 
Ibn Taymiyyah uses his citation to argue that whilst Muqatil was not from the people who transmitted Hadith, Muqatil should be considered to have breadth of knowledge, including in Tafsir and other areas, making an analogy with Abu Hanifa and his authority in fiqh, despite, according to Ibn Taymiyyah, people disagreeing with some of his other views.

Ibn Abi al-Izz (d. 731), a follower of Ibn Taymiyyah, argued that al-Ash'ari's material originated from the Mu'tazila and/or must have been tampered with.

Contemporary Saudi scholar Abdullah al-Ghunayman, author of the commentary on Ibn Taymiyyah's Al-Aqidah Al-Waasitiyyah, argues that he could not find anything he would consider anthropomorphic from Muqatil, arguing that to be reliable, ones views must be taken from one's own works, and not from the works of an opponent. Al-Ghunayman says "Mushabbih" has become a catch word to accuse one's opponents because of their different views.

See also 
 Hisham ibn Hakam

Notes 
 As discussed above - others such as Ibn ‛Abd al-Raḥmān al-Malṭī (d. 377/987) and Ibn Taymiyyah (d. 728/1328), did not consider him to have been an anthropomorphist.
 However one should note that both Ibn Mubarak and Wakee' were students of Abu Hanifa.
 Ibn Taymiyyah himself was accused of anthropomorphism, and was put on trial, found guilty and imprisoned for this.
 This is slightly different from what al-Mizzi, Ibn Taymiyyah's contemporary, reports of al-Shafi'i: "Whoever wants to study tafsīr he has to rely on Muqātil; whoever wants to study ḥadīth he has to rely on Mālik; and whoever wants to study kalam he has to rely on Abū Ḥanīfa"

References

External links
Biodata at MuslimScholars.info

8th-century births
767 deaths
Quranic exegesis scholars
8th-century Arabic writers
People from Balkh